Nicoletta Panni (August 27, 1933 – September 12, 2017) was an Italian lyric soprano.

Born in Rome, Panni was the granddaughter of Giuseppe De Luca, and was trained as a singer at the Accademia di Santa Cecilia under Giannina Arangi Lombardi. Her debut came in Trieste in 1957, when she sang Blanche in Dialogues of the Carmelites by Francis Poulenc. She bowed at La Scala in 1962, singing Euridice in Orfeo ed Euridice by Christoph Willibald Gluck. She appeared abroad as well, singing at the Liceu and Teatro Nacional de São Carlos. 1962 saw her American debut, as Marguerite in Faust by Charles Gounod at the Philadelphia Opera. The following year saw her debut at the Metropolitan Opera as Mimi in La Bohème. She later sang Marguerite at the Met. She appeared with Lyric Opera of Chicago in 1964 as Zerlina in Don Giovanni and Micaela in Carmen, and in 1965 performed Leonora in Il trovatore for Baltimore. Her career continued at various European houses until ending during the 1970s.

Panni died in Rome.

References

External links
 L'Istituto Nazionale Tostiano, 'Cordoglio per la morte del soprano Nicoletta Panni'
 Logan Martell, 'Obituary: Soprano Nicoletta Panni Passes Away, Aged 84'.  Opera Wire blog, 6 December 2017

1933 births
2017 deaths
Italian operatic sopranos
Singers from Rome
Accademia Nazionale di Santa Cecilia alumni
20th-century Italian women opera singers